Gustavo Kuerten was the defending champion but was forced to retire in the final losing 4–2 against Patrick Rafter.

Seeds
The top eight seeds received a bye to the second round.

  Gustavo Kuerten (final, retired because of right side muscle pull)
  Marat Safin (semifinals)
  Lleyton Hewitt (third round)
  Yevgeny Kafelnikov (second round)
  Patrick Rafter (champion)
  Tim Henman (quarterfinals)
  Arnaud Clément (third round)
  Thomas Enqvist (quarterfinals)
  Thomas Johansson (third round)
  Goran Ivanišević (semifinals)
  Andrei Pavel (second round)
  Todd Martin (withdrew because of a bruised knee)
  Hicham Arazi (second round)
  Nicolas Escudé (second round)
  Wayne Ferreira (first round)
  Tommy Robredo (third round)

Draw

Finals

Top half

Section 1

Section 2

Bottom half

Section 3

Section 4

External links
 2001 RCA Championships main draw

Singles